Thilakaratne Withanachchi is a Sri Lankan politician and a former member of the Parliament of Sri Lanka. He lost a re-election bid in 2010.

References

Year of birth missing (living people)
Living people
Members of the 13th Parliament of Sri Lanka
Janatha Vimukthi Peramuna politicians
United People's Freedom Alliance politicians